Kevin Johannes Willem Strootman  (born 13 February 1990) is a Dutch professional footballer who plays as a midfielder for Italian  club Genoa, on loan from French club Marseille.

Club career

Sparta Rotterdam
Born in Ridderkerk, Strootman began his career with Sparta Rotterdam, making his professional debut during the 2007–08 season. He signed a contract extension with the club in November 2008. After they were relegated at the end of the 2009–10 Eredivisie season, he played with Sparta in the Eerste Divisie.

Utrecht
In the January transfer window of 2011, Strootman was signed by FC Utrecht. He played with Utrecht in the second half of the 2010–11 season, before moving to PSV in June 2011.

PSV

Strootman was joined at PSV with fellow Utrecht recruit Dries Mertens. Strootman made his PSV debut in a 3–1 home win against AZ. He made 88 total appearances for the Eindhoven club.

Roma
On 16 July 2013, PSV and Roma finalized a deal for Strootman's transfer to the Italian side, in a deal worth €17 million, with the fee potentially rising to €19 million through add-ons. He was given the number 6 shirt.

In a pre-season friendly against the Major League Soccer (MLS) All-Stars, Strootman scored one goal and assisted another as Roma prevailed 3–1 at Sporting Park, Kansas City, Kansas. He scored his first competitive goal for Roma in 3–1 Serie A victory over Parma. He went on to score in matches against Torino, Atalanta, Milan and Livorno.

On 9 March 2014, Strootman sustained a knee injury in Roma's 1–0 defeat to Napoli which made him miss the remainder of the 2013–14 season and the 2014 FIFA World Cup, where the Dutch selection finished third.

On 9 November, Strootman made his first appearance for Roma in exactly eight months, appearing as an 84th-minute substitute in a 3–0 defeat of Torino at the Stadio Olimpico. His first start of the 2014–15 season came in a 2–2 draw with Sassuolo on 7 December. He assisted the first of captain Francesco Totti's two goals after appearing as a substitute in Roma's 2–2 draw with Lazio in the 175th Derby della Capitale on 12 January 2015.

On 26 January 2015, Strootman was substituted in a Serie A fixture against Fiorentina after sustaining further damage to his anterior cruciate ligament. Three days later, it was confirmed that the player would again undergo knee surgery. On 26 August, it was reported that, in spite of failing to make a single appearance in seven months, Strootman's injury required further surgery which sidelined the player for the majority of the 2015–16 Serie A season. He made his first appearance of the season on 21 February 2016, as a substitute in a 5–0 home defeat of Palermo. On 2 May, he made his first start in over 15 months, playing the full 90 minutes in Roma's 3–2 win at Genoa. He ended the season with five appearances, including two starts. His only assist of the season came in a 3–1 final day victory over Milan at the San Siro.

On 20 August 2016, Strootman captained Roma in the opening match of the 2016–17 Serie A season, a 4–0 home win against Udinese. In the team's second fixture, he scored his first goal since January 2014 as Roma drew 2–2 at Cagliari.

On 29 May 2017, Strootman signed a new five-year contract with the 2017 Serie A runners-up.

Marseille
On 28 August 2018, Olympique de Marseille agreed with A.S. Roma on a €25 million (plus €3 million of bonus) transfer fee and signed Strootman on a five-year contract. AS Roma published a thank you and confirmation of the transfer on their website. Strootman mentioned the club's history, ambitions as well as his close relationship with coach Rudi Garcia as motivating factors to join the club.

On 10 January 2020, Strootman scored an 84th minute winner for Marseille after coming on as a substitute against Rennes.

Loan to Genoa 
On 12 January 2021 Strootman was loaned to Serie A club Genoa until the end of the season.

Loan to Cagliari 
On 3 July 2021, Strootman was announced by Serie A club Cagliari, on loan until the end of the 2021–22 season, with an option to renew for the 2022–23 season included.

Return to Genoa 
On 24 August 2022, Strootman returned to Genoa on a new loan.

International career
Strootman made his senior international debut for the Netherlands against Austria in 2011 and scored his first international goal against Finland in a UEFA Euro 2012 qualifier. He was a member of the Netherlands' squad at Euro 2012 but did not appear in any matches as the Dutch were knocked out at the group stage.

He appeared for the Netherlands U21 team at the 2013 UEFA Euro U21 Championship where the team reached the semi-finals, losing to Italy.

Strootman was a regular in Louis van Gaal's side during the 2014 FIFA World Cup qualifying campaign, but missed the tournament finals due to injury.

On 27 May 2016, Strootman made his first international appearance in two years after missing both the 2014 FIFA World Cup and the entirety of the team's unsuccessful UEFA Euro 2016 qualifying campaign. He was selected to start in a friendly match against the Republic of Ireland, playing 70 minutes before being substituted for Marco van Ginkel.

Style of play
Strootman is said to be a dynamic and tough-tackling midfielder, who also possesses good vision, technique, and balance on the ball. A tall, physically strong and tactically intelligent left-footed player, he has been described as a "modern" midfielder, due to his wide range of skills. He is best used as a central or defensive midfielder, often serving as either a box-to-box midfielder or mezzala – due to his work-rate, ball-winning abilities, and ability to help out in both attack and defence – or as a deep-lying playmaker, due to his range of passing, awareness, and ability to create goalscoring opportunities for his teammates after winning back possession. He is also capable of contributing to his team's offensive play with goals, courtesy of his powerful and accurate striking ability from outside the area, as well as his ability to get on the end of his teammates' passes by making late attacking runs into the box from behind. Strootman has been compared to compatriot Mark van Bommel. During his first season with Roma (2013–14), he earned the nickname la lavatrice ("the washing machine", in Italian), for his ability to always clean up play by winning back the ball and then distributing it precisely to his teammates.

Career statistics

Club

International

As of match played 11 October 2013. Netherlands score listed first, score column indicates score after each Strootman goal.

Honours
PSV
KNVB Cup: 2011–12
Johan Cruyff Shield: 2012

References

External links

 
 U21 stats at Ons Oranje

1990 births
Living people
Footballers from Ridderkerk
Association football midfielders
Dutch footballers
Dutch expatriate footballers
Netherlands youth international footballers
Netherlands under-21 international footballers
Netherlands international footballers
Eredivisie players
Eerste Divisie players
Serie A players
Serie B players
Ligue 1 players
FC Utrecht players
Sparta Rotterdam players
PSV Eindhoven players
A.S. Roma players
Olympique de Marseille players
Genoa C.F.C. players
Cagliari Calcio players
Dutch expatriate sportspeople in Italy
Dutch expatriate sportspeople in France
Expatriate footballers in Italy
Expatriate footballers in France
UEFA Euro 2012 players